Iolaus agnes, the Agnes sapphire, is a butterfly in the family Lycaenidae. It is found in Nigeria (the Cross River loop), Cameroon, the Republic of the Congo and the Democratic Republic of the Congo (Uele and Tshopo). The habitat consists of wet forests.

References

Butterflies described in 1898
Iolaus (butterfly)
Butterflies of Africa
Taxa named by Per Olof Christopher Aurivillius